Ludens (meaning playing in Latin) may refer to:
 Ludens, a fictional race in the Noon Universe
 Ludens (skipper), a genus of skippers in the family Hesperiidae
 Homo Ludens (book) ("Man the Player", alternatively "Playing Man"), a book written in 1938
 Musa ludens, a chamber music group from Slovakia founded in 1981
 Pax Ludens, a non-profit organization specialized in training and research on international conflict and crisis management
 "Ludens", a song by Bring Me the Horizon from the Death Stranding soundtrack album and their EP Post Human: Survival Horror
 Luden's Tempest an item in the moba game League of Legends. The item was formerly known as Luden's Echo but was renamed in 2020.

See also
 Luden, a surname
 Luden's, a brand of throat lozenge, currently manufactured by Prestige Brands

Latin words and phrases